The Sturgeon River is a river located in Kenora District in northwestern Ontario, Canada.

Tributaries
Campfire River
Confusion River

See also
List of rivers of Ontario

References

The Official Road Map of Ontario on-line section 13 retrieved 2007-11-08

Rivers of Kenora District